Carprofen is a non-steroidal anti-inflammatory drug (NSAID) of the propionic acid class that was previously for use in humans and animals, but is now only available to veterinarians for prescribing as a supportive treatment for various conditions in only animals.  Carprofen reduces inflammation by inhibition of COX-1 and COX-2; its specificity for COX-2 varies from species to species.  Marketed under many brand names worldwide, carprofen provides day-to-day treatment for pain and inflammation from various kinds of joint pain, as well as post-operative pain.

Human use
Carprofen was used in humans for almost ten years, starting in 1988. It was used for the same conditions as in dogs, namely joint pain and inflammation. Side effects tended to be mild, usually consisting of nausea or gastrointestinal pain and diarrhoea. It was available only by prescription in 150 mg to 600 mg doses.  Dosage over 250 mg was only for relieving pain after severe trauma, such as post-surgery inflammation.  150 mg doses were commonly used to relieve the pain of arthritis, while 200 mg doses were commonly prescribed in cases of severe arthritis or severe inflammation pain.  The drug was taken orally.  Pfizer voluntarily removed it from the market for human use on commercial grounds.

Veterinary medicine

Canine use
Carprofen is one of eleven approved non-steroidal anti-inflammatory drugs for use in dogs.  These are non-steroidal anti-inflammatory drugs that aid in the relief of inflammation, pain, and fever.  Carprofen can be administered in a pill, chewable tablet, or injection form.

Often, Carprofen is used as a long-term pain management drug, or after a surgical procedure for acute relief of pain and inflammation during the healing process.  When using long-term, osteoarthritis is often the targeted condition, since it is common in canine patients, varying across breed, size, and age.

For patients in need of acute or chronic pain management, Carprofen is seen to improve energy, activity level, comfort, and general wellbeing of the dog.

Adverse effects
Most dogs respond well to carprofen use, but like all NSAIDs, it may cause gastrointestinal, liver, and kidney problems in some patients.

In 1999, the Food and Drug Administration (FDA) in the USA had more than 6000 anecdotal reports of sudden animal death after usage of Pfizer's Rimadyl brand of carprofen.  As a result, the FDA requested that Pfizer advise consumers in their advertising that death is a possible side effect.  Pfizer refused and pulled their advertising; however, they now include death as a possible side effect on the drug label.  Plans call for a 'Dear Doctor' letter to advise veterinarians, and a safety sheet attached to pill packages.

Adverse effects should be monitored and brought to your local veterinarian's attention when a patient is on an NSAID for chronic pain management.

Adverse effects include:
Loss of appetite
Vomiting
Diarrhea
Increase in thirst
Increase in urination
Fatigue and / or lethargy (drowsiness)
Loss of coordination
Seizures
Liver dysfunction: jaundice (yellowing of eyes)
Blood or dark tar-like material in urine or stools
Lethargy
Staggering, stumbling, weakness or partial paralysis, full paralysis
Change in skin (redness, scabs, or scratching)
Change in behavior (such as decreased or increased activity level, seizure or aggression)
In rare situations, death has been associated with some of the adverse reactions listed above. 

Effects of overdose include gastritis and ulcer formation.

In healthy dogs given carprofen, no perioperative adverse effects on the cardiovascular system have been reported at recommended dosages.  Perioperative administration of carprofen to cats did not affect postoperative respiratory rate nor heart rate.

Carprofen should not be administered concurrently with steroids, as this can cause ulcers in the stomach.  Dogs should be taken off carprofen for three full days before ingesting a steroid (such as prednisolone).  Carprofen should not be given at the same time with other types of medications, such as other NSAIDs (aspirin, etodolac, deracoxib, meloxicam, tepoxalin), or steroids such as dexamethasone, triamcinolone, cortisone, or prednisone.

Carprofen must be used with caution within the supervision of a veterinarian in dogs with liver or kidney disease, dehydration, bleeding deficits, or other health problems.  It is not recommended for use in dogs with bleeding disorders (such as Von Willebrand's disease), as safety has not been established in dogs with these disorders.  It has not been established whether carprofen can be safely used in pregnant dogs, dogs used for breeding purposes, or in lactating dogs.

Several laboratory studies and clinical trials have been conducted to establish the safety of using carprofen.  Clinical studies were conducted in nearly 300 dogs of different breeds.  The dogs were treated with Rimadyl at the recommended dose for two weeks.  According to these studies, the drug was clinically well tolerated, and the treated dogs did not have a greater incidence of adverse reactions when compared to the control group.

A number of factors may contribute to the high incidence of adverse reports received for carprofen by the Center for Veterinary Medicine in the late 1990s.  These include:
The type of drug;
Wide use;
Duration of use. Long-term use can result in a higher risk for adverse reactions. It is recommended that blood tests for liver and kidney function are performed both prior to starting and regularly while on NSAIDs to monitor the patient’s tolerance;
Senior dog use. Older dogs are generally more prone to side effects caused by carprofen.

Equine use
Carprofen may be administered intravenously to horses.  A single dose has been shown to reduce prostaglandin E2 production and inflammatory exudate for up to 15 hours, although there was less effect on eicosanoid production when compared to the effects produced by NSAIDs such as phenylbutazone or flunixin.  Prostaglandin E2 and inflammatory exudate are also reduced and leukotriene B4 is inhibited.  Carprofen can also be given orally, but intramuscular use may produce muscle damage.

Brands and dosage forms for veterinary use
It is marketed under many brand names including: Acticarp, Artriofin, Austiofen, Bomazeal, Canidryl, Carporal, Carprieve, Carprocow, Carprodolor, Carprodyl, Carprofelican, Carprofen, Carprofène, Carprofeno, Carprofenum, Carprogesic, Carprosol, Carprotab, Carprox, Comforion, Dolagis, Dolocarp, Dolox, Eurofen, Kelaprofen, Librevia, Norocarp, Norodyl, Novocox, Ostifen, Prolet, Quellin, Reproval, Rimadyl, Rimifin, Rofeniflex, Rovera, Rycarfa, Scanodyl, Tergive, Vetprofen, and Xelcor.

Veterinary dosage forms include 25 mg, 75 mg, and 100 mg tablets, and 50 mg per mL injectable form.

References

External links

Nonsteroidal anti-inflammatory drugs
Propionic acids
Carbazoles
Chloroarenes
Veterinary medicine
Dog medications
Equine medications